The Libya national rugby union team represents Libya in international rugby union. They are a not member of the World Rugby
, and are yet to play in a Rugby World Cup tournament. The Libya national rugby team played their first ever international against Algeria in 2010, with Algeria winning the game 50 points to 0, during the 2010 CAR Development Trophy, played in Cairo, Egypt. Libya played a second match during the tournament, losing to Mauritania by 10 points to 5.

Record

Overall

External links
 http://www.libyarugby.com

African national rugby union teams
Rugby union in Libya
Rugby